Alice Buck Norwood Spearman Wright (March 12, 1902 - March 12, 1989) was an American liberal feminist advocating for human relations. From 1954 to 1967, she served as the executive director of the South Carolina Council on Human Relations, which was an affiliate of the South Carolina Division of the Southern Regional Council (SRC). She directed the council to participate in the Voter Education Project, which helped to promote compliance with the Civil Rights Act of 1964.

Early life and education 
Spearman was born on March 12, 1902, in Marion, South Carolina, to Samuel Wilkins Norwood, a well known South Carolina banker and Albertine Buck, the daughter of one of South Carolina's largest slave owners. Spearman attended private and public schools in Marion, South Carolina and studied at Converse College, where she earned a bachelor of arts degree in history and literature in 1923. After graduating from the college, Spearman taught school in South Carolina before moving to New York City in 1926, where she earned a master's degree in religious education from Teachers College, Columbia University.

She was a member of the Young Women’s Christian Association, where she practiced her Baptist religious beliefs through social service. Particularly, after finishing her career in Teachers College, Columbia University, she took courses at the YWCA National Training School and Union Theological Seminary and worked for the YWCA in Germantown, Pennsylvania. After attending an international student conference in Oxford, England, Spearman decided to begin a three-year journey around the world. She studied Asian culture in Japan and travelled to the Soviet Union, and India.

Early career 
After returning from her journey, Spearman was soon appointed as a relief director in Marion County, where she set up relief for textile workers in the United Textile Workers of America strike in 1934. In 1935, she married Eugene H. Spearman Sr., whom she worked with. Because the Employment Act of 1932 prohibited both spouses from being federal employees, Spearman quitted her job and move to Newberry, South Carolina. In 1951, overwhelmed by financial problems, Spearman sought a full-time position as an executive secretary of the South Carolina Federation of Women's Clubs (SCFWC) and as an associate editor of the Club Woman magazine.

Anti-segregation efforts 
In October 1954, Spearman became the first full-time and paid director of the South Carolina Council on Human Relations. In the aftermath of the Supreme Court’s decision in Brown v. Board of Education, she devoted much of her efforts into desegregation. Particularly, she attempted to reach out to various white women's organizations and encouraged them to understand the racial injustice facing society. Because Spearman believed the idea that privileges bring responsibilities, her central philosophy focused on pushing women to their limits at the time women were largely excluded by social movements. Additionally, she also served as a bridge between the progressive women members of the Southern Regional Council (SRC), whom she tested her innovative ideas with and older generation members, whom she sought advices from.

Spearman tried to form a coalition with white men, but her efforts were unsuccessful. In 1959, under Spearman’s leadership, the SRC launched several initiatives, including the student sit-ins and lunch-counter demonstrations of the desegregation movement. Spearman and her council also worked to create educational and economic opportunities for black South Carolinians. Through her lobbying efforts, in 1963, the University of South Carolina admitted three African-American students. Under Spearman’s leadership, the South Carolina Council, chartered independently of the Southern Regional Council in 1963, joined the Voter Education Project (VEP) and participated in programs addressing issues regarding illiteracy, job opportunities, and poverty in rural South Carolina.

Later life and death 
In March 1970, Spearman married Marion Wright, whom she had forged an enduring friendship with while she was fighting in the civil rights movement. Both moved to Linville Falls, North Carolina. Wright and Spearman were honored with the Frank Porter Graham Civil Liberties Award from the American Civil Liberties Union, respectively in 1969 and in 1973. After Wright died in February 1983, Spearman returned to Columbia, South Carolina. On her eighty-seventh birthday, March 12, 1989, Spearman died at the South Carolina Episcopal Home at Still Hopes.

References

Activists for African-American civil rights
People from Marion, South Carolina
Activists from South Carolina
Teachers College, Columbia University alumni
Converse University alumni
1902 births
1989 deaths